Baritius is a genus of moths in the family Erebidae. The genus was erected by Francis Walker in 1855.

Species

Baritius acuminata (Walker, 1856)
Baritius affinis Rothschild, 1910
Baritius brunnea Hampson, 1901
Baritius cerdai Toulgoët, 2001
Baritius cyclozonata (Hampson, 1901)
Baritius discalis Walker, 1855
Baritius eleuthera (Stoll, [1781])
Baritius eleutheroides Rothschild, 1909
Baritius flavescens Rothschild, 1909
Baritius grandis Rothschild, 1909
Baritius hampsoni (Dognin, 1907)
Baritius haemorrhoides Schaus, 1905
Baritius kawensis Toulgoët, 2001
Baritius nigridorsipeltatus Strand, 1921
Baritius sannionis Rothschild, 1909

Former species

Baritius cepiana (Druce, 1893)
Baritius drucei Rothschild, 1910
Baritius morio Seitz, 1920
Baritius palmeri Rothschild, 1916
Baritius pyrrhopyga (Walker, [1865])
Baritius roseocincta Seitz, 1920
Baritius superba (Schaus, 1889)

References

Toulgoët, H. de (2001). "Description de nouvelles Arctiides néotropicales et d'un nouveau genre (Lepidoptera: Arctiidae: Arctiinae) 68ème note". Nouvelle Revue d'Entomologie. 18 (2): 113–121.

External links

Phaegopterina
Moth genera